Athar may refer to:
 Hadith, Islamic historical accounts about Muhammad, alternately called Athar in Arabic language, meaning tradition
 Faisal Athar (born 1975), Pakistani cricketer
 Athar Ali Bengali, politician
 Sohaib Athar, Pakistani computer scientist
 Athar (Planescape), a faction of Sigil in the Planescape campaign setting
 Ittar or athar, an essential oil used as perfumes
 Antiquities Trafficking and Heritage Anthropology Research Project (ATHAR)